Tahir Hussain Siddique is an Indian politician and leader of Samajwadi Party and an ex-member of Uttar Pradesh Legislative Assembly (won on Bahujan Samaj Party's ticket). He was arrested by the Goa Police for possessing 10 live cartridges without licence at Dabolim Airport in 2007. He was convicted and sentenced to one-year imprisonment by the Court.

Siddique contested from Chhibramau seat on BSP's ticket in the 2017 Uttar Pradesh Assembly election but got defeated by Archana Pandey Bharatiya Janata Party.

References

Bahujan Samaj Party politicians from Uttar Pradesh
Uttar Pradesh MLAs 2012–2017
Living people
Indian politicians convicted of crimes
Criminals from Uttar Pradesh
People from Kannauj district
Year of birth missing (living people)
Samajwadi Party politicians from Uttar Pradesh